Phillip John and Timothy Jay Hanseroth are twin musicians best known for being the bassist and guitarist, as well as songwriters with Brandi Carlile in her eponymous band. They won a Grammy for best American roots song in 2019.

The twins met Carlile in 1999 after being introduced by producer Rick Parashar. Carlile and Tim Hanseroth began playing music together, with Phil joining up a little later. Carlile has said, "One of my biggest regrets is going with my name as the name of the band." The three musicians split all their money evenly three ways. Before meeting Carlile, the twins were in a band called the Fighting Machinists in which they both played guitar. Phil now plays bass when they play with Carlile. Both Tim and Phil write songs for the band but have somewhat different styles. As Carlile says, "Tim doesn’t think about it when he writes... he writes more linear songs based on the story and the grooves and the melody. But Phil always thinks about singing—he wants these big, dynamic power ballad moments, even in his up-tempo songs." All three musicians sing, often in three-part harmonies.

The twins grew up in Seattle, Washington, in the Greenwood and Mountlake Terrace neighborhoods.  They live in Maple Valley, Washington. Both are divorced and each has a son and a daughter. Phil is now married to Brandi’s sister, Tiffany. They are co-founders, with Carlile, of the Looking Out Foundation.

References

Living people
People from King County, Washington
Singers from Washington (state)
Songwriters from Washington (state)
Grammy Award winners
American twins
Year of birth missing (living people)